At the 1996 Summer Olympics, two different wrestling disciplines were contested: freestyle wrestling and Greco-Roman wrestling.

Medalists

Freestyle

Greco-Roman

Medal table

Participating nations
A total of 401 wrestlers from 75 nations competed at the Atlanta Games:

References

External links
International Olympic Committee results database

 
1996 Summer Olympics events
1996
O